Pavel Radishevsky (born 13 September 1974) is a former Russian football player.

References

1974 births
Living people
Soviet footballers
Russian footballers
FC Asmaral Moscow players
Russian Premier League players
FC SKA-Khabarovsk players
Association football goalkeepers